Kempa Govindaraj is Indian National Congress activist, member of Karnataka Legislative Council, Vice-President of Indian Olympic Association and President of the Basketball Federation of India. He was the Chief minister's  parliamentary secretary in the Siddaramaiah cabinet.

Political distinctions and services rendered to Congress Party 

 Two term Member of hiedi Council
 Former Parliamentary Secretary to Chief Minister of Karnataka
 Presently, Chairman Karnataka Urban Infrastructure Development and Finance Corporation
 Presently serving as President, Basketball Federation of India, New Delhi
 At present serving as General Secretary, Karnataka Pradesh Congress Committee
 Contested as candidate of Shivajinagar Assembly Constituency in the year 1999
 Sacrificed Shivajinagar Assembly Constituency during general election 2004
 Served as Accommodation Co-coordinator in 2001-AICC Session at Bangalore
 Served as In-charge of Bangalore South Parliamentary Constituency during 2004 General Elections to Parliament and Assembly
 Served as Observer in Hassan District for Zilla Panchayat Taluka Panchayat Elections held in 2005
 Served as Observer during Bangalore City Mahanagar Palike Elections
 Served as Observer for the Municipal Council elections in Raichur District
 Served as Observer for Membership Enrolment, Devanagari District, Karnataka
 Served as In charge of Hubli Dharwad Municipal Corporation Elections
 Worked as District Returning officer in the Organizational Elections during the year 2009-2010
 Worked as Assistant Returning Officer during the Organizational elections of the Party
 Actively participated in Congress Party Rallies, Organizing Medical Camp Party Meetings
 Observer during the by-elections to the Kanaka Pura Lok Sabha Constituency
 Served as Observer for the Elections of President, Vice Presidents of Zilla Panchayats Taluka
 Panchayats in Dharwad District-2005
 Party Observer for Lok Sabha Elections held during the year 2009
 Party Observer for Vidhana Sabha Elections-2013

Career Background 

 Currently serving as President, Karnataka Olympic Association
 Currently serving as Vice President of Indian Olympic Association
 Currently working as President, Basketball Federation of India, New Delhi.
 Member of the Federation of International Basketball Association's Competition Commission (First Indian)
 Presently serving as Hon. Secretary, Karnataka State Basketball Association for the last 25 years
 Serving as a member of Sports Authority of Karnataka for the last 10 years
 Organizing Secretary for the 18th FIBA Asian Basketball Championship for Junior Men-2004, held at Bangalore
 Conducted Basketball event in the IV National Games during the year 1997
 Organized many national events, South zone, Inter zone, All India Senior, Junior and Youth National Basketball Championships in Bangalore during (1990-2007)
 Serving as Selection Committee Member for prestigious Ekalavya Awards for the last 8 years
 Presently serving as Director, Indian Cost Accountants Institute, Government of India Nominee
 At present serving as Syndicate Member, Kuvempu University
 Served as Chef de Mission manager of Indian Contingent in many International Sports events
 Served as a Government Nominee on the Board of Directors of Bangalore Water Supply Sewage Board (BWSSB)
 Started Career as National Basketball Player
 Best all-rounder in school and college teams
 Served as Selection committee member for Indian basketball teams for the year 2000-2007
 Represented as technical delegate in the Asian basketball championship held at Nagoya (Japan) during the year 1990, for the Asian games held at Busan, Korea in 2002, for the Commonwealth games held at Melbourne, Australia in 2006, Olympic games held at Beijing, China in the year 2008
 Served as Manager of Indian team at Asian basketball championship held at Shanghai (China) during 2001, and as a manager of Indian team at Asian basketball championship held at Jakarta (Indonesia)
 Served as Chef-de-Mission of Indian women basketball team at Hebei, Beijing 2002 and also for 24th FIBA Asia Basketball Championship for men at Japan in 2007
 Appointed organizing Secretary & Chairman, Games Technical conduct committee for the first ever youth national games which were held at Bangalore.

Contribution to sports as Organiser of various sports events 

 Organized South Zone, Inter Zone, All India Senior, Junior and Youth National Basketball Championships in Hassan Mysore & Bangalore (1990-2017)
 Conducted Basketball event in the fourth National Games during the year 1997
 Organizing Secretary for the 18th FIBA Asian Basketball Championship for Junior men -2004, held at Bangalore for the first time in Karnataka
 Organizing secretary for the FIBA Asia cup Championship for women & FIBA Asia U-16 Women Championship for the year 2017
 Organizing Secretary for FIBA - 2019 world cup qualifiers for men
 Organizing Secretary for FIBA - Asia U18 Women Championship 2018 held at Bangalore
 First State in India to introduce Karnataka Olympic Association Awards for Sportsperson
 First state in India to have its own Olympic Bhavan
 Elected to represent South Asia in the FIBA General Assembly in Bengaluru in June 2019

Awards 
 Karnataka State Dasara Awardee for the best sports promoter in the year 1993
 Prestigious INDIRA PRIYADARSHINI AWARD 2006 for outstanding contribution to Social Service and sports

Education 
M.A., Political Science
Diploma in Public Relations

References

External links 
 K. Govindaraj (Criminal & Asset Declaration)
 

Living people
Members of the Karnataka Legislative Council
Indian National Congress politicians from Karnataka
Indian sports executives and administrators
1959 births